Matthew H. Caldwell (born August 12, 1981) is an American Republican politician and a former member of the Florida House of Representatives, representing the 79th District, which includes northern  Lee County, stretching from Lehigh Acres to North Fort Myers, from 2012 to 2018. Caldwell previously represented the 73rd District from 2010 to 2012.

Caldwell was the Republican nominee for Florida Commissioner of Agriculture in 2018, but lost the general election to Democrat Nikki Fried.

History

Caldwell is a 7th generation Florida native whose family came to Micanopy in 1826. Matt attended Florida Gulf Coast University, from which he received a degree in history in 2004. He works as a real estate appraiser and consultant with Maxwell, Hendry, Simmons in Fort Myers, having attained the highest state certification in his field and being qualified as an expert witness in multiple states and federal court.  Matt was a member of the Florida House of Representatives from 2010 to 2018, serving on and chairing several committees during his tenure, including tax policy, redistricting, insurance and banking, agriculture, natural resources and public lands, transportation and infrastructure, local, federal, and military affairs, & oversight of government operations, such as pensions & elections.

Campaign history

2008 
In 2008, when Democratic State Senator Dave Aronberg ran for re-election in the 27th District, which sprawled from West Palm Beach to Cape Coral and included parts of Charlotte County, Glades County, Lee County, and Palm Beach County, Caldwell ran against him. He won the uncontested Republican primary and advanced to the general election. Ultimately, Caldwell won only 39% of the vote to Aronberg's 59% and Green Party candidate Aniana Robas's 2%.

2010 
When incumbent State Representative Nick Thompson opted to run for a position as a Circuit Judge on the 20th Judicial Circuit of Florida in 2010 rather than seek re-election, Caldwell ran to succeed him in the 73rd District, based in northern Lee County, including Fort Myers and stretching from Suncoast Estates to Gateway. He faced Jason Moon, John Schultz, and Deanna Casalino in the Republican primary. Caldwell was able to narrowly defeat his opponents to win his party's nomination, receiving 35% of the vote to Moon's 29%, Schultz's 27%, and Casalino's 8%, and he advanced to the general election, where he was opposed by Democratic nominee Cole Peacock and Tea Party candidate Pantoja Rodriguez in the general election. In the end, Caldwell defeated both of his opponents, winning 59% of the vote to Peacock's 38% and Rodriguez's 3%.

2012 
When state legislative districts were redrawn in 2012, Caldwell was moved into the 79th District, which retained most of the territory that he had previously represented in the 73rd District. In the Republican primary, he was opposed by Jon Larsen Shudlick, whom he was able to defeat in a landslide, winning re-nomination with 86% of the vote. He was unopposed in the general election and won his second term in the legislature uncontested.

2014 
Caldwell again ran for District 79 in 2014. In the Republican primary he faced opponent Matt Miller. Caldwell was able to win the race with 60.6% to his opponents 39.4%. He did not have an opponent in the general election once again.

2016 
In Caldwell's last race for the Florida House in 2016, he won 51% to Democratic candidate John W. Scotts 38% and Independent Matt Millers 10.6%.

2018 
After terming out of the Florida House of Representatives, Caldwell ran for Agricultural Commissioner of Florida. In the Republican primary election, Caldwell won the party's nomination receiving 34% of the vote to Denise Grimsley's 26%, Mike McCalister's 12%, and Baxter Troutman's 26%. In the general election, Caldwell faced Democrat Nikki Fried. On election night, Caldwell appeared to be leading by a margin of more than 40,000 votes, but after the votes were fully counted, the margin was close enough that a recount was performed, and after that recount, he was narrowly defeated by 6,753 votes out of more than eight million cast.

2020 
In 2020 Caldwell ran for Lee County Property Appraiser after Ken Wilkinson retired from his 40 year long tenure. In the Republican Primary he was opposed by Matt Miller and was able to move onto the General with 59% of the vote. In the General Election Caldwell faced only a write in candidate and was able to win the election with 96% of the vote. Also in 2020, Caldwell ran for State Committeeman for the Republican Party of Florida and was able to defeat the incumbent, Chris Crowley, with 54% of the vote.

References

External links
Florida House of Representatives - Matt Caldwell

|-

1981 births
21st-century American politicians
American members of the Churches of Christ
Florida Gulf Coast University alumni
Living people
Republican Party members of the Florida House of Representatives
People from Gainesville, Florida
People from North Fort Myers, Florida